Semljicola latus is a spider species found in Scandinavia, Russia and Mongolia.

See also 
 List of Linyphiidae species (Q–Z)

References 

Linyphiidae
Spiders of Europe
Spiders of Asia
Spiders described in 1939